The 2022 RideLondon Classique was the eighth edition of the RideLondon Classique, part of the UCI Women's World Tour. The race was part of the RideLondon cycling festival. The race took place from 27 to 29 May 2022. It was won by Dutch rider Lorena Wiebes, who also won all three stages.

It was the first time that the Classique took place over multiple days, having previously been a one-day race in central London. The Classique was last held in 2019, due to the COVID-19 pandemic. 

Compared to previous editions of the Classique, there was a reduced prize pot of €60,000 spread out over the three stages. 

The race was criticised for not providing live TV coverage for all three stages - with only the final stage in central London broadcast live.  The UCI subsequently warned that the 2023 event would be demoted to the UCI ProSeries if stages were not broadcast on live television.

Teams 
In April 2022, organisers announced that 21 teams had been invited to take part, with 12 UCI Women's WorldTeams and 9 UCI Women's Continental Teams.

UCI Women's WorldTeams

 
 
 
 
 
 
 
 
 
 
 
 
UCI Women's Continental Teams

Route and stages 
Revealed in February 2022, the route used two stages in Essex, with the third stage using a central London circuit similar to previous editions of the RideLondon Classique.

Classification leadership table

External links 

 RideLondon Classique - Official site

References 

RideLondon
RideLondon
RideLondon
RideLondon